Alive As Fuck was released in 2009. It is the first live album by the Nashville, TN rock band, Black Diamond Heavies. This album was recorded during their show at the Masonic Lodge, in Covington, KY and was released under the Alive Records label.

Track listing

References

External links

2009 albums
Black Diamond Heavies albums
Alive Naturalsound Records albums